There were more than 400 Allied vessels struck by Japanese special attack weapons in the last twelve months of World War II, including some vessels that were struck as many as six times in one attack. The one special weapon that is most often associated with World War II is the Japanese kamikaze aircraft. Kamikaze was used to describe the way the Japanese believed they would be victorious by destroying the Allied fleet by crashing aircraft into their ships. The word kamikaze originated as the name of major typhoons in 1274 and 1281, which dispersed Mongolian invasion fleets under Kublai Khan. The Allies referred to these special weapons as "suicide" attacks, and found it difficult to understand why an individual would intentionally crash an airplane into a ship, as the two cultures clashed in battle. Both Imperial Japanese Navy and Imperial Japanese Army had Special Attack Units organized specifically for this mission. Aircraft were not the only special attack weapons. Attack boats, suicide divers, and several types of submarines were also used to destroy ships and landing craft as the Allied forces advanced toward Japan.

The use of the term "code name" in reference to Japanese aircraft (Betty, Kate, Val etc.) is incorrect. They were "nicknames", merely used for ease of identification and pronunciation.  There was nothing classified that required the use of "code".

Kamikaze aircraft

Numbers quoted vary, but at least 47 Allied vessels, from PT boats to escort carriers, were sunk by kamikaze attacks, and about 300 damaged. During World War II, nearly 3,000 kamikaze pilots were sacrificed. About 14% of kamikaze attacks managed to hit a ship. The Japanese high command exaggerated the effectiveness of the tokko attacks, claiming six aircraft carriers, one escort aircraft carrier and ten battleships had been sunk.

Standard IJN and IJA aircraft

Almost every make and model of aircraft were used as kamikazes. The most often seen were the Mitsubishi A6M ("Zero," allied code name "Zeke"), Aichi D3A (Allied code name "Val"), Mitsubishi G4M (Allied code name "Betty"), Nakajima B5N (Allied code name "Kate"), Yokosuka P1Y (Allied code name "Francis"), although in the final months of the war, every flyable aircraft was used. The Army used the Kawasaki Ki-61 (Allied code name "Tony"), Mitsubishi Ki-46 (Allied code name "Dinah"), although like the Navy, all available aircraft were to be used as the threat to Japan increased after Iwo Jima fell.

Ohka
The Yokosuka MXY-7 Ohka (also spelled Oka)  (櫻花; Shinjitai: 桜花; "cherry blossom"; Hebon-shiki transcription Ōka) was a purpose-built kamikaze aircraft employed by the Imperial Japanese Navy Air Service in the last months of World War II. US forces gave the aircraft the Japanese name Baka which loosely translates as "idiot" or "fool" in English.

Ohka was a small flying bomb that was carried underneath a Mitsubishi G4M "Betty", Yokosuka P1Y Ginga "Frances" or the planned Heavy Nakajima G8N Renzan (Allied code name "Rita") transport type 43A/B and heavy bomber to within range of its target; on release, the pilot would first glide towards the target and, when close enough, he would fire the Ohkas engine(s) and dive into the ship to destroy it. That final approach was almost unstoppable (especially for the rocket-powered Ohka Type 11) because the aircraft was capable of attaining tremendous speed. Later versions were designed to be launched from coastal air bases and caves, and even from submarines equipped with aircraft catapults, although the war ended before they were used this way.

Tsurugi

The Nakajima Ki-115 Tsurugi (剣 "Sabre") was a one-man purpose-built kamikaze aircraft developed by the Imperial Japanese Army Air Force in the closing stages of World War II in late 1945. More than 100 Ki-115s were completed.

Toka
The Toka (藤花, "Wisteria Blossom") was the IJN version of the Nakajima Ki-115 Ko. Showa was to build the Toka for the IJN.

Shusui
The Mitsubishi J8M Shūsui (Japanese: 三菱 J8M 秋水, literally "Autumn Water", used as a poetic term meaning "Sharp Sword" deriving from the swishing sound swords make) used by the Navy and Ki-200 for the Army. The Shusui ("Sword Stroke") was a rocket powered interceptor. It was the Japanese copy of the German Me 163 rocket powered interceptor fighter that was specially designed for use against high flying B-29 bombers. The prototype flew on 7 July 45. The war ended before production.

Hiryu To-Go
The Hiryu To-Go, also known as the Ki-167 "Sakura-dan", was a Mitsubishi Ki-67 Kai (Allied code name "Peggy")  twin-engine bomber with guns removed and faired over, crew reduced to four men. This flying bomb was built with 3 ton thermite shaped-charge bomb behind the cockpit, pointed forward and angled slightly down, and a blast radius of 1 km. Two of these aircraft were known to have been built. One sortied 17 April 1945 and did not return.

Shinryu
The Mizuno Shinryu ("Divine Dragon") was a proposed rocket-powered kamikaze aircraft designed for the Imperial Japanese Navy towards the end of World War II. It never reached production.

Maru-Ten
The Maru-Ten was Nakajima's designation for the '. This was a suicide weapon with no landing gear, was catapult launched using Rocket Assisted Take Off (RATO), used Ne-12B engines, and carried a single bomb.

Baika
The Kawanishi Baika (梅花, "Ume Blossom") was a pulsejet-powered kamikaze aircraft under development for the Imperial Japanese Navy towards the end of World War II. The war ended before any were built. The design was greatly inspired by the manned version of the German V1 flying bomb, the Fieseler Fi 103R "Reichenberg".

Boats

Shin'yō

The Shin'yō (Japanese: 震洋, "Sea Quake")  were Japanese suicide boats developed during World War II. They were part of the wider Special Attack Units program. The Shinyo units were known as Shimpu Tokubetsu-Kogekitai. About 6,200 Shinyo were produced for the Imperial Japanese Navy.

Maru-Ni
An additional 3,000 of the Shinyo were produced for the Imperial Japanese Army as Maru-Ni. The Maru-Ni units were known as Shimbu Tokubetsu-Kogekitai. About 400 of these boats were sent to Okinawa and Formosa, the rest were stored on the coast of Japan for the ultimate defense against the invasion of the Home Islands. The Maru-Ni attacked by dropping one or two shallow-set depth charges as close to the target ship as possible, with the intention of turning away as the depth charges were released off the stern.

Midget submarines

Ko-hyoteki

The  class was a class of Japanese midget submarines (Ko-hyoteki) was manufactured in three Types:
 Type A Ko-hyoteki-class midget submarines were used in the 1942 Attack on Sydney Harbour, Attack on Diego Suarez Harbor and the 1941 attack on Pearl Harbor.
 Type B Midget Ha 45 prototype built 1942 to test Type A improvements.
 Type D Koryu (115 completed) improved Type C with crew of 5 and radius increased to 1000 miles at 8 knots surfaced and 320 miles at 16 knots submerged.

Kaiten
The Kaiten (literal translation: "Return to the sky", commonly rendered as: "The turn toward heaven", "The Heaven Shaker" or "Change the World") was a torpedo modified as a suicide weapon, and used by the Imperial Japanese Navy in the final stages of World War II.

Early designs allowed for the pilot to escape after the final acceleration towards the target, although whether this could have been done successfully is doubtful. There is no record of any pilot attempting to escape or intending to do so, and this provision was dropped from later production kaitens.  The inventor of the Kaiten, Lt. Hiroshi Kuroki was lost during one of the first training missions.  When the sub was raised a note was found with a note written during his final minutes before death, sending his respects to his family and detailing the cause of the accident and how to repair the defect.

Kairyu

The  was a Small, 2-man, midget submarine of the Imperial Japanese Navy of 20 ton that was based on the
Type A midget submarine that was used in the 1941 attack on Pearl Harbor. All five of the Type A midget submarines used were captured (1) or destroyed (4). Midgets also attacked in Sydney (all four lost) and Madagascar in June 1942.   The Kairyu mini-submarines were meant to meet the invading American Naval forces upon their anticipated approach of Tokyo. Although not intended only as a suicide weapon, crew survival was possible, but the odds of survival were not high. These mini-submarines were built so that they could be equipped with either two torpedoes or a 1,000 pound warhead in the bow, for crashing into ships as the kaiten did. Over 760 of these submarines were planned, and by August 1945, 200 had been manufactured, most of them at the Yokosuka shipyard, but of the 200, only 115 were ready for use at the time of surrender.

Fukuryu
Fukuryu (Japanese:伏龍, Fukuryu "Crouching dragons") suicide divers were a part of the Special Attack Units prepared to resist the invasion of the Home islands by Allied forces. They were equipped with a diving jacket and trousers, diving shoes, and a diving helmet fixed by four bolts.
The Fukuryu  were armed with a   mine fired with a contact fuse, fitted onto the end of a  bamboo pole. To attack, they would swim under a ship and slam the mine onto the ship's hull, destroying themselves in the process. This new weapon is only known to have been used a few times operationally:
January 8, 1945: Infantry landing craft (gunboat) LCI(G)-404 damaged by suicide divers in Yoo Passage, Palaus.
February 10, 1945: Attempted attack on surveying ship USS Hydrographer (AGS-2) by suicide divers in Schonian Harbor, Palaus.

Land-based suicide weapons

Nikaku
Although the Nikaku were not specifically designated as anti-ship weapons, the mental conditioning and training they received prepared them to pilot a Maru Ni, should the need arise.  Nikaku were IJA soldiers with explosives strapped to their bodies, acting as human anti-tank mines. The method used in the attack was very simple: the soldier would crawl between the tank treads or allow the tank to drive over him, then explode the charge.  The army pioneered this technique in the Philippines and on Okinawa. Other methods used were where the weapon was a shaped-charge on a spike or a simple hand grenade.

Giretsu Kūteitai
 was an airlifted special forces unit of the Imperial Japanese Army formed from Army paratroopers, in November 1944 as a last-ditch attempt to reduce and delay Allied bombing raids on the Japanese home islands.  These forces were airlifted and crash landed onto Allied Army or Marine air strips, with the intention of destroying as many aircraft as possible before being killed. On 24 May 1945, a Giretsu force of five Mitsubishi Ki-21 bombers, commanded by Captain Chuichi Suwabe, attacked Yontan airfield, in northern Okinawa. The planes crash-landed on the airfield, where the suicide commandos destroyed nine aircraft, damaged 29 others and set on fire 70,000 gallons of fuel. All the Japanese paratroopers were slain save one, who managed to reach the Japanese lines. Two US servicemen were killed in action.

List of ships
This table lists every known ship that was attacked and damaged by a Japanese special weapon. Not included are ships that were not damaged from a near miss, or were damaged when debris from another ship that was attacked and hit fell or flew on or into it.

Unless otherwise noted, these ships were hit by one kamikaze aircraft.

Bibliography

Notes

Lists of World War II ships